Lee Tschantret (born April 10, 1969 in Albany, New York) is a retired soccer defender. He spent most of his career in the National Professional Soccer League and its successor, the Major Indoor Soccer League. He also played outdoor soccer in the American Professional Soccer League and USL A-League.

Youth
Tschantret is originally from Albany, New York. He attended the  University at Albany where he played on the school's NCAA Division III soccer team from 1987 to 1990. During his four season he scored 50 goals and added 40 assists. He was a 1988 second team and a 1989 first team All American.

Professional
In 1991, he played 20 games, scoring 2 goals, for the Albany Capitals of the American Professional Soccer League. That year, the Capitals went to the APSL championship, losing to the San Francisco Bay Blackhawks. In 1992, he played for the Harrisburg Heat in the National Professional Soccer League. In 1994, he move to the Kansas City Attack. In 1995 and 1996, he played the summer outdoor season with the New York Centaurs in the A-League. In 1998, he played for the Hershey Wildcats in the A-League. He was named to the 1998 First XI (All Star Team).  That fall, he played for the Philadelphia KiXX before the team traded him in February 1999 to the St. Louis Steamers for Ken Snow. He returned to the A-League in 1999, this time with the Staten Island Vipers.  In the fall of 1999, he signed with the Detroit Rockers, but only played one season with them before moving to the Baltimore Blast. In 2000, he played six games, scoring two goals, with the Pittsburgh Riverhounds.  He finished his career in the MISL with the Blast in 2007. 

Tschantret led the Major Indoor Soccer League in penalty minutes all time with 748. He is on pace to be the 15th player to record 1000 points.

On February 2, 2007, he gained his 1000th assist in a victory over the KiXX.

In November, 2008, Tschantret signed with the Philadelphia KiXX of the NISL.

Coaching
Tschantret holds a USSF National A Coaching License. He is the current head coach for Varsity Soccer at Loyola Blakefield in Towson, Maryland.

References

External links
 Baltimore Blast Player's Page

1969 births
Living people
Albany Capitals players
American men's futsal players
American Professional Soccer League players
American soccer coaches
American soccer players
Albany Great Danes men's soccer players
Baltimore Blast (2001–2008 MISL) players
Baltimore Blast (NPSL) players
Detroit Rockers players
Association football defenders
Association football forwards
Association football midfielders
Association football utility players
Futsal players at the 2007 Pan American Games
Harrisburg Heat (NPSL) players
Hershey Wildcats players
Kansas City Attack (NPSL) players
Major Indoor Soccer League (2001–2008) players
National Professional Soccer League (1984–2001) players
New York Centaurs players
Sportspeople from Albany, New York
Pan American Games competitors for the United States
Philadelphia KiXX (2008–2010 MISL) players
Philadelphia KiXX (NPSL) players
Pittsburgh Riverhounds SC players
Soccer players from New York (state)
Staten Island Vipers players
Tampa Bay Rowdies (1975–1993) players
St. Louis Ambush (1992–2000) players
A-League (1995–2004) players